Alexander Cumming (December 23, 1825 – May 14, 1894) was the fourth governor of the Territory of Colorado, serving from 1867 to 1869 as a member of the Republican Party.

Hunt was born in New York, New York on January 12, 1825. Soon after his birth his family moved to Freeport, Illinois, where he grew up and later served as mayor.  Hunt traveled to California in 1850 to join the California Gold Rush and to the Pike's Peak Country in 1858 to join the Pike's Peak Gold Rush. Hunt was chosen as the judge of the Vigilante Committee of the Jefferson Territory.  In 1861, Hunt was appointed U.S. Marshal for the new Territory of Colorado.

U.S. President Andrew Johnson appointed Hunt as the new governor of the Territory of Colorado on April 24, 1867. Hunt served as the territorial governor until June 14, 1869 when new president Ulysses S. Grant appointed his friend Edward Moody McCook to replace him.

Hunt died in Washington, D.C., on May 14, 1894, and is buried in the Congressional Cemetery with his wife Alice (died 1920) and her parents (Judge John Curtiss Underwood and his wife Maria) and brother.

See also

 History of Colorado
 Law and government of Colorado
 List of governors of Colorado
 Territory of Colorado

External links
 The Governors of Colorado @ Colorado.gov
 Biography of Alexander Cumming @ Colorabbi.gov
  – Congressional Cemetery, Washington, DC
  – cenotaph, Riverside Cemetery, Denver, Colorado

1825 births
1894 deaths
Colorado Mining Boom
Governors of Colorado Territory
People from Colorado
People from Freeport, Illinois
Politicians from New York City
Colorado Republicans
19th-century American politicians